Sweetener is the fourth studio album by American singer Ariana Grande. It was released on August 17, 2018, through Republic Records. Grande co-wrote all the songs on the album except for the first track, and its production was handled by Pharrell Williams, Charles Anderson, Hit-Boy, Ilya Salmanzadeh, and Max Martin, with guest features from Williams, Nicki Minaj and Missy Elliott.

The album explores themes of romance, sexual intimacy, unhealthy relationships, womanhood, anxiety, and perseverance through hardships. Primarily a pop, R&B and trap record, it also incorporates elements of house, funk, neo soul and hip hop music, mainly consisting of uptempo tunes and downtempo ballads, which heavily incorporate harmonies. Sweetener received critical acclaim upon its release, favoring the experimental nature of its production. Some critics considered it a vital record in Grande's career due to its subject matter. It won Best Pop Vocal Album at the 61st Annual Grammy Awards, scoring Grande her first Grammy Award. Sweetener featured in numerous publications' year-end music lists of the best albums of 2018, and was subsequently inducted in decade-end lists of the 2010s.

Three singles were released from Sweetener, all of which reached the top-twenty of the US Billboard Hot 100: The lead single, "No Tears Left to Cry", debuted and peaked at number three, while the second and third singles, "God Is a Woman" and "Breathin", reached numbers eight and twelve, respectively. Sweetener debuted at number-one on the US Billboard 200, making it Grande's third album to reach the summit. It was certified platinum by the Recording Industry Association of America (RIAA), and topped charts in many other countries, including in Australia, Canada, Ireland, New Zealand and the United Kingdom. Grande ventured on a four-show promotional tour, entitled The Sweetener Sessions, after the album's release. Launched in further support of both Sweetener and its successor, Thank U, Next (2019), Grande embarked on the Sweetener World Tour in 2019.

Background and recording 
On May 20, 2016, Grande released her third studio album Dangerous Woman, which was met with positive reviews and commercial success. Work on Sweetener commenced around early July of that year, the first song created being the title track, co-written and produced by Pharrell Williams. On November 13, 2016, Grande stated on Snapchat that she had finished her fourth album. Later, she clarified by saying, "I didn't mean to make an album, and I don't know if it's done at all, but I just have a bunch of songs that I really really like. I've been working a lot and have been creating and feeling inspired." Further confirmation came in December 2017, when Grande confirmed that she was still working on the album.

Grande's manager Scooter Braun told Variety that the album has a more mature sound: "It's time for [Ariana] to sing the songs that define her... Whitney, Mariah, Adele – when they sing, that's their song. Ariana has big vocal moments; it's time for her song." Williams told Los Angeles Times: "The things that [Ariana] has to say on this album, it's pretty next-level." Producers Max Martin and Savan Kotecha were later confirmed to have collaborated with Grande in the album. On December 28, 2017, Grande shared several pictures of her in the studio throughout the year. On December 31, 2017, Grande shared a snippet from the album on her Instagram, with the caption "see u next year"; it was later revealed that the track was the closing track on the album, titled "Get Well Soon".

In April 2018, it was reported that Grande was planning on releasing the album's lead single on April 27, 2018. The following week, on April 16, 2018, it was reported that Grande had moved up the lead single release to April 20, 2018, due to label-mate Post Malone's album Beerbongs & Bentleys being released on April 27. The following day, Grande announced that the album's lead single, "No Tears Left to Cry" and revealed the release date to be April 20, 2018.

Grande appeared on The Tonight Show Starring Jimmy Fallon, where she announced that her album was titled Sweetener and that it would be released that summer. She further explained the meaning behind the title is "It's kind of about like bringing light to a situation, or to someone's life, or somebody else who brings light to your life, or sweetening the situation." A May 2018 cover article in Time magazine by Sam Lansky noted that, for the first time with this album, Grande "took the lead on writing". In late May 2018, she announced that the album would feature fifteen tracks and three collaborations, which are Missy Elliott, Nicki Minaj and Williams.

In early June 2018, Grande announced during her set at Wango Tango that the album would be available for pre-order on June 20, and "The Light Is Coming" would be released as a promotional single along with it. The second single, "God Is a Woman", was announced to be released on July 20, 2018, however, on July 12, Grande surprised fans by announcing that the single would be released the following day. Prior to the album's release, Spencer Kornhaber of The Atlantic commented that the first three singles from the album "sparked with a sense of defiance and rattled mortality ... [a] trifecta of pseudo-spiritualism and sneaky innovation. ... Grande's music and videos radiate [intoxicating, unworried confidence]".

Music and lyrics 

Musically, Sweetener is a pop, R&B and trap record that includes elements of house, funk, neo soul and hip hop music on its beats and productions. The melodies and harmonies on the album are diverse and include uptempo songs and many different downtempo, sentimental ballads. Stephen Thomas Erlewine from AllMusic stated that the album "deepens the R&B inclinations of 2016's Dangerous Woman." In an interview with Zach Sang, Grande said: "The thing that I love most about this project sonically, is that all I really did was sing in my sweet lower register".

Songs 

The album begins with 38-second a cappella intro, "Raindrops (An Angel Cried)", written by Bob Gaudio, and originally performed by Frankie Valli and the Four Seasons. "Blazed" is a high tempo funk-influenced song. It features vocals and background vocals by Pharrell Williams, who also produced the track. She first admitted the name of the song on her Twitter account. Lyrically, it is about "loving someone and being with them." "The Light Is Coming" merges hip hop and R&B elements. Grande sings the lyrics "The light is coming / to give back everything the darkness stole", over a "jittery beat" used with quick drums and synths, and a heavily sampled CNN archive clip of a man shouting at former senator Arlen Specter at a town hall meeting in Pennsylvania in 2009 concerning healthcare ("You wouldn't let anybody speak for this and instead!"). Israel Daramola described the song as a "glitchy, thumping" dance record with a sample that highlights Grande's "nursery rhyme-style melody" "R.E.M." is an R&B song that is built over a smooth doo-wop beat. The song's title stands for "rapid eye movement", which is where memorable and vivid dreams occur. In an interview with Jimmy Fallon for the Tonight Show, she admitted that "R.E.M." was her favorite song. She later confirmed on Twitter that "R.E.M." is a song based on Beyoncé's demo titled "Wake Up", a leftover from the singer's 2013 self-titled album.

The fifth track "God Is a Woman" contains lyrics about female sexual empowerment and spirituality; Time described the song as "an anthemic, sultry banger." A trap-pop song, "God Is a Woman" contains influences of reggae whilst "Sweetener" was the first song that Grande recorded for the album, and it features Williams vocals in the background similar to "R.E.M.". Being a trap-inspired song, it symbolises empowerment. "Successful" is a 90s-esque neo soul song that has elements of gospel and trap. Lyrically, it's about "girls feeling good about their own individual success." "Everytime" is a "trap-pop" song that contains a pop-rap chorus. "Breathin" is a dance-pop song that contains influences of synth-pop. The Independent called the song an "emotional highlight" and that it is a "mental health bop over a good, solid pop beat." Lyrically, it is about Grande's overcoming growth from anxiety.

"No Tears Left To Cry" is a dance-pop and disco song with a UK garage beat. It was served as the first official single for the album. Lyrically, it is about overcoming a tragic event and trying to turn it into a positive and uplifting experience. Many listeners interpret this as her way of addressing the Manchester Arena bombing that took place at her Dangerous Woman Tour concert in May 2017. "Borderline" is a 90s contemporary R&B song that features American rapper Missy Elliott. It's one of Grande's favorites on the album. "Better Off" is a "retro-fied" ballad that discusses a toxic relationship. "Goodnight n Go" is an EDM song with deep house and tropical influences. It contains a sample of "Goodnight and Go", written and performed by Grande's inspiration Imogen Heap. In an interview with Billboard, Heap said that "it feels like a gift". She went on saying: "When somebody that famous picks up on a song that has had its day and gives it a second life, it's a real gift. I think she's done a lovely version of it." "Pete Davidson" is an interlude of the album and has a trap and hip hop production. Lyrically, it is about her then-fiancé, Pete Davidson. "Get Well Soon" is a soul-ballad that has a laid back R&B melody with lyrics that talk about Grande's personal anxiety and trauma following the Manchester Arena bombing. At the end of the song, 40 seconds of silence are played as a tribute to the twenty-two victims of the bombing, bringing the duration of the track up to 5:22, a reference to the date of the bombing. (May 22, 2017).

In a 2018 interview with Zach Sang, Grande mentioned she had recorded over 30 songs for the album that did not end up making the final cut, including "On Top of Everything".

Title and artwork 
Grande hinted the album title to be Sweetener in an Instagram post on November 5, 2016. On May 1, 2018, Grande appeared on The Tonight Show Starring Jimmy Fallon where she formally announced the title, and further explained: "It's kind of about like bringing light to a situation, or to someone's life, or somebody else who brings light to your life, sweetening the situation."

The artwork for Sweetener consists of colorful, upside-down and other-worldly visuals. The cover of the album's lead single, "No Tears Left to Cry", features Grande's side profile lit by a rainbow and the title of the song written in rotated, upside-down text. In the song's music video, Grande is seen walking on walls and ceilings. The cover of the album's only promotional single, "The Light Is Coming", which features Nicki Minaj, is an upside-down picture of Grande. After her performance of "No Tears Left To Cry" on The Tonight Show, where the set was inspired by the song's music video and photo shoot, Grande took to Instagram to reveal that the film was one of the inspirations for the aesthetic.

Grande revealed on Twitter that the inspiration for the upside-down theme was when she showed a friend sitting opposite her a picture, and "he said 'I even love it upside-down' and that was kind of it for me. At the time I had been feeling very 'upside-down' for a while & the simplicity of that was like, 'oh duh, wow, my bestie a genius.' Everything clicked after that." The album artwork of Sweetener is a simplistic upside-down portrait of Grande with grey hair and the title of the album written in black at the bottom. It was shot by Dave Meyers, who directed the music videos for the album's first two singles, "No Tears Left to Cry" and "God Is a Woman", and the promotional single "The Light Is Coming". It was revealed piece by piece on a separate Instagram account, named after the album, starting on June 12, 2018, leading up to the release of the album's pre-order on June 20, 2018. The artwork was the first in her discography to be in color, which she said was because it was "a new chapter. For the first time, my life is in color, as well."

Promotion and release 

Grande went silent on all social media after sharing a snippet of a song from the album on December 31, 2017. On April 17, 2018, Grande broke her silence by sharing a teaser of the album's lead single, "No Tears Left to Cry", which was released on April 20, 2018, alongside its music video. In the music video, she teased the album by writing some of the song names, including "God Is a Woman", "Breathin", "R.E.M.", "Successful", "Sweetener", "Borderline" and the first 3 letters of "Blazed", which was teased again in a behind-the-scenes video. She first performed the song at Coachella later that night, as a guest during the performance of DJ Kygo. Grande announced the title of the album and several song titles on The Tonight Show Starring Jimmy Fallon on May 1, 2018, shortly before performing "No Tears Left to Cry". She also opened the 2018 Billboard Music Awards with a performance of the song on May 20, 2018. On June 2, 2018, Grande performed at Wango Tango in California, closing her set with a performance of "No Tears Left to Cry" and also sharing a snippet of "The Light Is Coming". On August 8, 2018, three dates were announced for a series of promotional concerts in the United States, titled The Sweetener Sessions, in partnership with American Express. Sweetener was released on August 17, 2018.

Grande also announced a world tour in support of the album and her fifth album Thank U, Next. Titled the Sweetener World Tour, it began on March 18, 2019, and concluded on December 22, 2019. A concert film titled Ariana Grande: Excuse Me, I Love You, is based on the tour and was released on Netflix on December 21, 2020.

Singles 
The album's lead single, "No Tears Left to Cry", was released on April 20, 2018, alongside its music video. The track debuted at number three on the US Billboard Hot 100, becoming Grande's ninth Hot 100 top-ten and sixth to debut in the top-ten, tying Grande with Lady Gaga and Rihanna in sixth among acts with the most top 10 debuts on the chart. The single made Grande the first artist in the chart's 60-year history to debut in the top 10 with a lead single from each of her first four albums. The song also topped the Mainstream Top 40 chart in July 2018, reached number one in nine countries and top-ten in twenty others. It was later certified triple Platinum by the RIAA, for earning over three million units in the United States.

"God Is a Woman" was released as the albums second official single on July 13, 2018, with its music video premiering 12 hours after the song's release. The single debuted at number eleven on the Billboard Hot 100 and peaked at number eight, making it Grande's tenth top-ten song on the chart and placing her as the twelfth overall artist and seventh female artist with the most Hot 100 top-tens in the 2010s decade. The song also became Grande's second single to top the US Mainstream Top 40 airplay chart from Sweetener, and third overall. It was later certified double Platinum by the RIAA, for earning over two million units in the United States.

"Breathin" was released to US contemporary hit radio as the third and final single from the album on September 18, 2018. The song debuted at number 22 on the Billboard Hot 100, and later peaked at number 12. Its music video, directed by Hannah Lux Davis premiered on November 7, 2018, on her YouTube account.

Promotional single 
"The Light Is Coming", featuring Nicki Minaj, was released on June 20, 2018, along with the pre-order of the album as the only promotional single from the record. The song debuted at number 95 on the Billboard Hot 100 and later peaked at number 89, following the release of the parent album.

Critical reception

Reviews 

Sweetener received critical acclaim from music critics. At Metacritic, which assigns a normalized rating out of 100 to reviews from mainstream critics, Sweetener has an average score of 81 based on 20 reviews, indicating "universal acclaim".

Reviewing for Vice, Robert Christgau called the album a "garden of sonic delights" and wrote: "Grande is pleasant in such a physically uncommon and technically astute way. Her pure, precise soprano is warm without burr or melisma, its mellow sweetness never saccharine or showy". In The New York Times, Jon Pareles said the singer's voice "can be silky, breathy or cutting, swooping through long melismas or jabbing out short R&B phrases; it's always supple and airborne, never forced. […] Ms. Grande sails above any fray, past or present. Her aplomb is her triumph." Brittany Spanos of Rolling Stone called the album "a refreshing, cohesive package. … [The producers' approach lets] Grande's easy way with trap phrasing find a home next to her flair for Broadway-esque dramatic runs"; it combines "the sensual romance of the album's plentiful love songs and the aching heartbreak of the others." Spanos concludes that it is Grande's "best album yet, and one of 2018's strongest pop releases to date. Kate Solomon of The Independent commented that with music that is "often unexpected, sometimes in a good way, it is an album by an artist in flux – trying to move forward while reluctant to fully relinquish old ideas." Some critics dubbed Sweetener an important album in Grande's catalogue.

Writing for NME, Douglas Greenwood deemed the album "[a] confident, accomplished, sometimes left-field collection of pop bangers, proving that she's not shy of experimentation." He also commented that "there are a couple of songs on Sweetener that you'd happily leave on the shelf." Similarly, in The Guardian, Alexis Petridis said that "her collaborations with Pharrell really push the boundaries. But they make the rest of this album seem formulaic." He considered the album "uneven", with its attempts to balance out what Grande called a "weird" record. Petridis felt that "the world could use more pop music as imaginative as Sweeteners highlights."

Neil McCormick in The Daily Telegraph felt that "the quality of the songs is high, although there are moments when they might be trying too hard to demonstrate that the teen queen is all grown up now," and argued, "as modern, branded, blockbuster pop albums go, Sweetener is a delightful confection." He commented less favorably about guest rappers Nicki Minaj and Missy Elliott, who "sound like they dialled in clichéd verses for a pay cheque."

Rankings 
In December 2018, Billboard placed Sweetener at the top of their year-end list for the best albums of 2018. Complimenting Grande's take on the sadness, they said "she didn't let her past define her, and she didn't dwell on what her future may hold, either" and praised Grande that "while most fans couldn't possibly relate to her extraordinary circumstances, Grande still ended the year seeming more approachable and human than ever". Sweetener alongside its followup Thank U, Next placed on Billboard's decade end album's list "The 100 Greatest Albums of the 2010s" at numbers 38 and 8 respectively. They called Sweetener her most personal sound and "a radiant, pure snapshot of what stumbling upon happiness sounds like". They said that Grande had "found herself -- and graduated to a new level of pop superstardom". On their rankings of the Grammy's Best Pop Vocal Album winners, Yardbarker ranked Sweetener number 15 on their list. Sweetener landed a number two position on Paper's "Top 20 Albums of 2018".

Awards and nominations

Commercial performance

United States 
According to Billboard, as of 2022, Sweetener is one of the 15 best-performing 21st-century albums without any of its singles being number-one hits on the Billboard Hot 100. Sweetener debuted at number-one on the US Billboard 200 with 231,000 album-equivalent units, of which 127,000 represented traditional album sales. It marked Grande's third number one album in the US and her fastest-selling album to date. Among female artists, Sweetener scored the second-largest US sales debut of 2018, behind Cardi B's Invasion of Privacy (255,000 album-equivalent units).

The album's songs recorded 126.7 million on-demand audio US streams through its first week, constituting the largest streaming week ever for a non-hip hop album by a woman, a record later bested by Grande's Thank U, Next. It was also the fourth non-hip hop record ever to cross 125 million on-demand first-week streams. Billboard noted Sweetener's strong performance on streaming services was remarkable for a pop album at the time, since streaming was  dominated by rap music.

On the US Billboard Hot 100 chart, issue dated September 1, 2018, ten of Grande's songs (nine of which are from Sweetener) charted simultaneously, placing Grande as the fourth female artist with the most simultaneous entries on the chart for a female soloist, behind Taylor Swift, Beyoncé, and Cardi B. The same week, Grande ascended to number one on the Artist 100 chart, due to strong album sales and song streams. In its second week, Sweetener descended to number four, moving 75,000 equivalent album units, while in its third week, it fell one position to number five, with a furthered 56,000 units earned.

Sweetener was ranked 38th on the 2018 year-end Billboard 200 chart. The succeeding year, on the 2019 year-end Billboard 200 chart, Sweetener was ranked as 32nd most popular album of the year. On April 3, 2019, the album was certified platinum by the Recording Industry Association of America (RIAA) for combined sales and album-equivalent units of over a million units in the US. As of June 2020, the album has sold 321,000 copies in the country.

Other territories 
Sweetener topped the record charts of 22 territories, and reached the top 10 in six other markets. In the United Kingdom, Sweetener debuted at number one on the UK Albums Chart, moving 45,000 album-equivalent units. It became her second number-one album in the UK, and her fastest selling album to date. Following its release, two album tracks entered the UK Singles Chart as "Breathin" debuted at number eight, and "Sweetener" landed at number 22, while the single "God Is a Woman" ascended six places to number six. Sweetener was the best-performing album of 2018 by a foreign female artist in the UK. It has been certified platinum by the British Phonographic Industry (BPI), for shipments of over 300,000 units in the country.

In Australia, the album became Grande's third number one on the ARIA Albums Chart. All 15 of the album's tracks placed on the ARIA Singles Chart simultaneously, becoming Grande's first album to do so. It ranked as the country's fourth-best-selling solo album by a female artist in 2018. Additionally, two Sweetener singles, "No Tears Left to Cry" and "God Is a Woman", landed in ARIA's annual top singles chart for the same year.

Impact 
Grande's embrace of trap music on the album was praised by some critics for showcasing the contemporary influence of hip hop on pop music. Elias Leight of Rolling Stone declared that Sweetener "proved trap was the new pop" with the collaborations with Williams, Martin and Salmanzadeh. Leight stated "the mass embrace of the trap template demonstrates the remarkable extent to which a once-niche style now rules modern production". In Billboards opinion, "while [Grande's] peers and predecessors find themselves victim to changing tastes and trends within the pop landscape, Ariana continues to rise untouched above them". Sweetener message of love, positivity, and resilience has been noted by media outlets as one of its signature traits. Evening Standard named Grande "the most important artist of 2018" due in part to the positivity she expressed in the album. Paper paralleled the album with Beyoncé's Lemonade (2016), saying "like Beyoncé who made Lemonade from her own life's lemons just two years ago, Sweeteners legacy will be its resoundingly positive message about true love's grace and its ability to help us cope with loss".

Track listing 

Notes
 "Raindrops (An Angel Cried)" is an a cappella cover of "An Angel Cried", a 1964 song written by Bob Gaudio and performed by The Four Seasons.
"R.E.M." contains elements of "Wake Up", a demo track by Beyoncé.
"Goodnight n Go" contains a sample of and incorporates lyrics from "Goodnight and Go" (2006), written and performed by Imogen Heap.

Personnel 
Credits adapted from the liner notes of Sweetener.

Performers and musicians

Ariana Grande – vocals
Pharrell Williams – featured artist , additional vocals 
Nicki Minaj – featured artist 
Missy Elliott – featured artist 
Rickard Göransson – guitar 
Peter Lee Johnson – strings 
Max Martin – bass , drums , keyboards , percussion 
Ilya Salmanzadeh – background vocals , drums , guitar , keyboard , bass , percussion 

Production

Charles Anderson – production 
Brian Malik Baptiste – production 
Cory Bice – recording engineer assistance 
Scooter Braun – executive production
Tommy Brown – production 
Andrew Coleman – recording , digital editing , arrangement 
Kris Crawford – recording assistance 
Thomas Cullison – recording assistance 
Aubrey "Big Juice" Delaine – vocals recording 
Jacob Dennis – recording engineer assistance 
Scott Desmarais – mix assistance 
Corte Ellis – recording 
Missy Elliott – recording 
Iain Findlay – recording assistance 
Robin Florent – mix assistance 
Michael Foster – production 
Chris Galland – mix assistance 
Şerban Ghenea – mixing 
Ariana Grande – executive production, vocal production
Hart Gunther – recording assistance 
John Hanes – mix assistance 
Hit-Boy – production 
Sam Holland – recording 
Chris Khan – recording assistance 
David Kim – recording assistance 
Mike Larson – recording , digital editing , arrangement , additional programming 
Guillermo Lefeld – recording assistance 
Jeremy Lertola – recording engineer assistance 
Manny Marroquin – mixing 
Max Martin – production , programming 
Randy Merrill – mastering
Brendan Morawski – recording engineer assistance 
Manny Park – recording assistance 
Noah Passovoy – recording 
Ramon Rivas – recording engineer assistance 
Ilya Salmanzadeh – production , mixing , programming 
Ben "Bengineer" Sedano – recording assistance 
Jon Sher – recording assistance 
Phil Tan – mixing 
Pharrell Williams – production 
Bill Zimmerman – additional engineering 

Artwork
Dave Meyers – photography
Jessica Severn – art direction, design

Charts

Weekly charts

Monthly charts

Year-end charts

Decade-end charts

Certifications

Release history

See also 

 List of Billboard 200 number-one albums of 2018
 List of number-one albums of 2018 (Australia)
 List of number-one albums of 2018 (Canada)
 List of number-one albums of 2018 (Ireland)
 List of number-one albums of 2018 (Mexico)
 List of number-one albums from the 2010s (New Zealand)
 List of number-one albums in Norway
 List of number-one albums of 2018 (Scotland)
 List of number-one hits of 2018 (Switzerland)
 List of UK Albums Chart number ones of the 2010s
 List of UK Album Downloads Chart number ones of the 2010s

References 

2018 albums
Albums produced by Hit-Boy
Albums produced by Ilya Salmanzadeh
Albums produced by Max Martin
Albums produced by Pharrell Williams
Albums produced by Tommy Brown (record producer)
Ariana Grande albums
Grammy Award for Best Pop Vocal Album
Republic Records albums
Trap music albums